From the Underground and Below is the ninth studio album by the thrash metal band Overkill released in 1997 by CMC International. Two cover songs were recorded during these sessions: "No Feelings" by Sex Pistols and "Space Truckin'" by Deep Purple. Lead singer Bobby "Blitz" Ellsworth considers From the Underground and Below to be one of his favorite Overkill albums. 

The album was re-issued along with Necroshine (1999) as part of a box set in 2003.

Track listing

Credits
Bobby "Blitz" Ellsworth – lead vocals
D.D. Verni – bass, backing vocals
Sebastian Marino – lead guitar
Joe Comeau – rhythm guitar, backing vocals
Tim Mallare – drums

Additional personnel
 Produced by Overkill
 Mixed by Colin Richardson
 Tracking and mix engineer, Andy Katz
 Mastered by Howie Weinberg at Masterdisk, New York City, USA
 Pre-production at Gear Rehearsal Studios, Shrewsbury, New Jersey, USA
 Demos recorded by Filthy Tracks Studio, Rochester

Charts

References

External links
 Official OVERKILL Site

Overkill (band) albums
1997 albums
CMC International albums